Lilian du Plessis (born 17 December 1992) is a South African field hockey player for the South African national team.

She participated at the 2020 Summer Olympics. and the 2018 Women's Hockey World Cup.

Honours

Provincial

Southern Gauteng
 Indoor IPT: Ladies 2017 - Leading Goalscorer

KZN Raiders
 2021 Women's Inter-Provincial Tournament - Leading Goalscorer

International
 African Hockey Championships 2015 - Leading Goalscorer
 Africa Cup of Nations 2013 - Leading Goalscorer
 African Hockey Road to Tokyo 2020 - Leading Goalscorer

References

External links

1992 births
Living people
South African female field hockey players
Field hockey players at the 2014 Commonwealth Games
Commonwealth Games competitors for South Africa
Field hockey players at the 2020 Summer Olympics
Olympic field hockey players of South Africa
Alumni of St Mary's School, Waverley
20th-century South African women
21st-century South African women
Field hockey players at the 2022 Commonwealth Games